Jenny Jones is a 1944 musical composed by Harry Parr-Davies based on a book by Ronald Gow with lyrics by Harold Purcell. It is set in a Welsh village.

It premiered at the Brighton Hippodrome before transferring to begin a run of 153 performances at the London Hippodrome between 2 October 1944 and 22 January 1945. The original London cast included Carole Lynne and Jimmy James. It was produced by the impresario Edward Black.

References

Bibliography
 Wearing, J.P. The London Stage 1940-1949: A Calendar of Productions, Performers, and Personnel.  Rowman & Littlefield, 2014.

1944 musicals
British musicals
West End musicals